Guantian District is a rural district in central Tainan, Taiwan. It is the hometown of former Taiwanese President Chen Shui-bian. It hosts a population of 20,866 residents.

History 
Guantian (官田) was formerly known as the "Guantian" (官佃). During Dutch rule, this area belonged to the government as "Wang Tian" (王田). During Ming Zheng rule, Wang Tian was changed to "Guantian", and the land was handed over to the civil and military officials, who can then recruit the farmers. Among them, the Chen Yonghua family had the most commitments and gradually formed a Han Chinese settlement, hence the name "Guantian" (官佃).

Under the Qing rule, it became "Guantian village" (官佃庄). During the Japanese colonial era in 1920, it was renamed as "Guantian village" (官田庄), belonging to Zengwun County, Tainan Prefecture. In 1953 after the war, it became "Guantian Township" (官田鄉). On 25 December 2010, it was renamed as "Guantian District" (官田區).

Guantian District had human activities since three thousand years ago, but it was only officially established a hundred years ago under Japanese rule. Although the district administration of Guantian District is young, the history of the people and the land can be traced back to ancient times.

Administrative divisions 
The district consists of Guantian, Erzhen, Daqi, Longtian, Longben, Nanbu, Shezi, Wushantou, Duba and Tungxizhuang Village.

Education

Universities
 Tainan National University of the Arts

Schools

 Guantian Junior High School
 Chianan Elementary School
 Duba Elementary School
 Guantian Elementary School
 Lungtian Elementary School

Transportation 
 TRA Balin Station
 TRA Longtian Station
 Exits 329 and 334 of Freeway 3
 Exits 21 and 26 of Provincial Highway 84
 Provincial Highway 1
 City Routes 165, 171, and 176

Tourist attractions 
 Holiday Villa Mango Market
 Hulu Pond Water Chestnut Field
 Longtian Distillery
 Longtian Night Market
 Sijhuang Village Residence of President Chen Shui-Bian
 Wushantou Reservoir

Notable people 
 Chen Shui-bian, President of the Republic of China (2000–2008)
 Hsu Tain-tsair, Mayor of Tainan City (2001–2010)

References

External links 

 
 Guantian Junior High official website

Districts of Tainan